The Yorkshire Coach Horse is an extinct horse breed once native to England. It was a large, strong, bay or brown horse with dark legs, mane and tail. It was said to be "a longer-legged carriage horse with unmatched ability for a combination of speed, style, and power" and "a tall, elegant carriage horse".

With the introduction of macadamized roads, the Cleveland Bay horse was considered not fast enough, and as a result, some Cleveland Bays were bred to Thoroughbred horses to produce the Yorkshire Coach Horse. In 1886 a Yorkshire Coach Horse Stud Book was introduced, which contained horses that were three-quarters Cleveland Bay and one-quarter Thoroughbred.

The Yorkshire Coach Horse was much in demand by the rich and royal. The late 18th century was the golden age of carriage driving. Yorkshire Coach Horses were exported all over the world to provide matched pairs and teams. During the height of the London season, it is said that hundreds of pairs of Yorkshire Coach Horses could be seen in Hyde Park every afternoon.

The Stud Book was closed in 1936 with the decline of the coaching era. Since the foundation breeds of the Yorkshire Coach Horse still exist, it would be possible to restart this breed, but unlikely.

References

Extinct horse breeds
Horse breeds
Horse breeds originating in England